Frank David Gaviria Garizado (born 11 June 2001) is a Colombian professional footballer.

Career
Gaviria joined fourth-tier Croatian side NK Špansko in October 2020 after playing for Envigado. On 9 March 2022, he moved to USL Championship side Rio Grande Valley FC.

References

2001 births
Living people
Association football forwards
Colombian footballers
Rio Grande Valley FC Toros players
Colombian expatriate footballers
Colombian expatriate sportspeople in Croatia
Colombian expatriate sportspeople in the United States
Expatriate soccer players in the United States
Expatriate footballers in Croatia
USL Championship players